The following is a list of drivers who have competed in the Stadium Super Trucks. Since the inaugural season in 2013, 129 different drivers have run at least one race in the series. The Boost Mobile Super Trucks, SST's Australian championship, saw 14 drivers between their first year in 2020 and last in 2021; both series combine their statistics.

Founder Robby Gordon, Sheldon Creed, Paul Morris, Matthew Brabham, and Gavin Harlien have won championships. Brabham has three, Gordon and Creed have two each, one of Morris' titles came in SST while the other was in the Boost Mobile Super Trucks, and Harlien won in 2022. Creed also holds the most race wins in SST history with 39.

Sara Price and Zoey Edenholm are the only female drivers to compete in SST.

Key

Figures listed below are correct as of the most recent Stadium Super Trucks race weekend at Bristol Motor Speedway (September 3–4, 2022).

Heat race results such as wins are not included in the career total. Although some drivers failed to qualify for the feature race due to poor finishes in their heats, they receive points in the standings and are credited with starts by the series. Starts are not counted for races that a driver failed to start (classified as a "DNS").

2022 drivers

All-time drivers

Boost Mobile Super Trucks statistics

References

 
Stadium